Elachista juliensis is a moth of the family Elachistidae that is found from Germany to Italy and from Switzerland to Slovakia and Hungary.

The larvae feed on Carex humilis. They mine the leaves of their host plant. The mine starts as a narrow corridor following the midrib that ascends towards the leaf tip. It then turns and descends. Strips of uneaten parenchyma remain along the leaf margin. Most frass is deposited in the oldest part of the mine. Pupation takes place outside of the mine, mostly at the base of the mined leaf. They are wax-coloured. Larvae can be found from May to early June.

References

juliensis
Moths described in 1870
Moths of Europe